The 1990 DFB-Supercup was the fourth DFB-Supercup, an annual football match contested by the winners of the previous season's Bundesliga and DFB-Pokal competitions.

The match was played at the Wildparkstadion, Karlsruhe, and contested by league champions Bayern Munich and cup winners 1. FC Kaiserslautern.

Teams

Match

Details

See also
1989–90 Bundesliga
1989–90 DFB-Pokal
Deutschland-Cup (football)

References

1990
FC Bayern Munich matches
1. FC Kaiserslautern matches
1990–91 in German football cups
July 1990 sports events in Europe